Korea Aerospace University (한국항공대학교 (Traditional Chinese: 韓國航空大學校) [Han'guk Hang-gong Dae-hak-gyo]) is a private university located in Goyang, Gyeonggi, South Korea.

History

Beginnings (1950s–1960s) 
Korea Aerospace University was established as a national school on June 16, 1952. During the Korean War, under the Charter for Transport School, which was granted by the Ministry of Transportation (which is now the Ministry of Land, Transport, and Maritime Affairs) to develop a civil aviation industry. The university primarily started as a two-year course school, solely with three departments: Department of Flight Operation, Department of Aircraft Power, and Department of Telecommunication Engineering. Its status had been elevated by 1953.

After the War, the campus moved to Seoul in 1962, then to Goyang City, Gyeonggi-do in 1963, where it stands today. The school buildings were constructed, including the Hangar, the Flight Training Center, and the Electronics & Telecommunication Building. Several institutes such as the Central Library, the Maintenance Factory, the Wireless Lab, the Aviation Research Institute, the Training School for Aviation Tech were also opened.

Strengthened (1970s–1990s) 

In 1979, the university was taken over by Jungseok Foundation, established by Hanjin Group, and it transitioned into a private university.

Through the modifications on quota and name, the establishment of schools, departments, and graduate schools were finalized. Auxiliary organizations and institutes were reorganized (see "Centers and institutes").

Furthermore, the Liberal Arts Building, Central Library, the Aviation Control Center, the Mechanical Engineering Building, and the Flight Operation Building were opened in the 1970s; the Student's Hall, the Science Building, the Mechanical Engineering Building, the Electronic Engineering Building were constructed in 1990s.

Development (2000s- ) 

Following the strengthening period, the university started to focus on ensuring its internal stability. From the early 2000s, structures were added and expanded. The Central Library, the Center for Technical Assistance to Small and Medium-sized Industries, the KAU Aerospace Center/Museum, and the New Administrative Building were built. The Library and the Student's Hall had a level extension. The microsatellite CubeSat was developed and launched for the first time among Korean universities in 2006. Major research results have been observed in the realm of an unmanned aerial vehicle (UAV) since the first autonomous formation flight of UAV and the first flight of solar-powered UAV for 12 consecutive hours in Korea.

The university changed its name from Hankuk Aviation University to Korea Aerospace University in 2007. It started to develop its competence by expanding international networks. After obtaining AABI (Aviation Accreditation Board International) qualification, for flight education, aviation management, air traffic management, and air transportation systems in 2007, MOUs (memoranda of understanding) and agreements with well-known organizations were concluded: MOUs with the University of Southern California, Drexel University, Oregon State University; agreement for cooperation with Embry-Riddle Aeronautical University; joint development agreement with General Electric. The university — which encompasses most of the aerospace fields including Aerospace & Mechanical Engineering, Electronics, Telecommunications, Computer Engineering, Air Transportation and Logistics, Aeronautical Science & Flight Operation, and Air and Space Law — has been designated to take several national undertakings and collaborative research projects with prominent global corporations including GE, Airbus, PLANSEE since 2009.

Reputation 

 Selected as Education Capacity Enhancement Project for five years in a row, 2008–2012
 Accredited for ABEEK (Accreditation Board for Engineering Education of Korea), 2012
 Research funds per academic staff was ranked 6th, 2011
 Ranked 1st in the Management Evaluation for Private Universities, 2008

Research activities 

 CDSRC (the Defense Specialized University Research Center), 2011–
 Maritime Transport Education Project, 2011–
 GSRC (Global Surveillance Research Center), 2010–
 Logistics Specialized Education Project, 2010–
 Seoul Accord Activation Center, 2010–
 Industrial Technology Development Project, 2010–
 WPM (World Premier Materials Project), 2010–
 The Korea Electric Vehicle and Transportation Safety Convergence System Research Consortium, 2010–
 Haneul Project (for Aerospace Engineers and Global Aviation Experts), 2009–
 Seven NSLs (National Space Laboratory) and three NRLs (National Research Laboratory), 2008–

Organization

Undergraduate 

College of Engineering
School of Aerospace and Mechanical Engineering
Mechanical Engineering
Aerospace Engineering
Aircraft System Engineering
School of Electronics, Telecommunication & Computer Engineering
Electronic and Avionics Engineering
Information and Telecommunication Engineering
Software Engineering
Department of Materials Engineering
College of Aviation and Management
School of Air Transportation and Logistics
Air Transportation
Logistics 
Air and Space Law
Department of Aeronautical Science and Flight Operations
School of Business
Business Administration
Global Aviation Management
School of Liberal Arts and Sciences
Department of General Studies
Department of English

Graduate 

Graduate School	
Master's Course
Aerospace & Mechanical Engineering
Space Technology
Materials Engineering
Electronic Engineering
Telecommunication & Information Engineering
Computer Engineering
Aviation Management
Air Transport, Transportation and Logistics
Business Administration
English
Air & space Law
Doctor's Course
Aerospace & Mechanical Engineering
Space Technology
Materials Engineering
Electronic Engineering
Telecommunication & Information Engineering
Computer Engineering
Aviation Management
Air Transport, Transportation and Logistics
Business Administration
English
Graduate School of Aviation & Management
Aviation Industry Group(Master)
Techno-Management
Air Transport, Transportation and Logistics
Air & space Law
Aviation Management
Business Administration Group(Master)
Business Administration
Airline Management
Tourism Management
Advanced Management Program

Laboratories 

School of Aerospace and Mechanical Engineering
Micro & Nano Heat Transfer Laboratory
Rocket Propulsion Laboratory	
Space System Research Laboratory
Welding Laboratory
Fluid Power Control Laboratory
Applied Aerodynamic Laboratory
Spacecraft Control Laboratory
System Design Optimization Laboratory
School of Electronics, Telecommunication & Computer Engineering
Logic Circuit Laboratory
Data Mining Laboratory
Radar Signal Processing Laboratory
Parallel & Distributed Processing Laboratory
Applied Network Research Laboratory
Navigation & Information Systems Laboratory
Mobile Communication Laboratory
NGN Laboratory
RF Circuit Laboratory	
Silicon Graphics Laboratory
School of Air Transport, Transportation and Logistics
Ubiquitous Technology Application Research Center

Centers and institutes 

Global Aviation Training Institute (GATI)
Institute of International Culture and Education
KAU Aerospace Museum
Central Library
R&D Residence Complex
Computing Center
Air Traffic Control Station
University Newspaper
University Broadcasting Station
University Press Office
Research Institute of Aerospace Engineering and Technology
Aerospace and Aviation Electronics Research Center
Institute for Community Research
Institute for Aircraft Safety and System Management
Institute for Aviation Industry, Policy and Law
Student Counseling Center
Institute for Business Studies
Institute for Humanities and Natural Science
Center for Technical Assistance to Small and Medium-sized Industries
IT Research Center
Institute of Transportation and Logistics
Research Center for Internet Information Retrieval
Advanced Broadcasting Media Technology Research Center
Ubiquitous Technology Application Research Center (UTAC)
KAU Research Center for Robotics
Information Protection Research
Innovating Engineering Education Center
Innovating Aviation and Management Education Center
Center for Teaching and Learning

Remarkable Facilities

KAU Aerospace Museum

Korea Aerospace University established the KAU Aerospace Museum in pursuance of expanding the understanding on aviation and aerospace for the public in August 2004. With the area of 780m2, the museum exhibits more than 800 aviation and aerospace parts. It is structured with an Aerospace Zone, which exhibits the history of aerospace, a Flight Simulator, a Virtual Experience, an Experience Zone, which displays various plastic airplane, and a Future of Aerospace Zone, which exhibits the history and principle of rocket and satellite. KAU Aerospace Museum also earned the first accreditation from the FAI(Fédération Aéronautique Internationale) in Korea and was selected for receiving a benefit from 'Boeing GCC Fund'.

Flight Training Center

Flight Training Center (FTC) at Korea Aerospace University, one of the subsidiaries of GATI, was established to produce global-standard pilots for airlines and the military. The FTC provides a civil aviation pilot training program entrusted to KAU by Korean Air. For the development of general aviation, the FTC also has a flight training course for members of the public who wants to learn the basics of aviation.

FTC-Susaek

On the KAU campus, FTC-Susaek operates a private pilot course and instrument rating course, both certified by Korea's Ministry of Land, Transport and Maritime Affairs. FTC-Susaek operates an academic training course for APP ab-initio cadets and Korean Air (KAL) pilots, as well as a flight training course for the public.

FTC-Jungseok

FTC-Jungseok operates a jet transition course for Korean Air (KAL) pilots. FTC-Jungseok operates four CE-560s and two CE-525 aircraft, as well as CE-525 and CTN-II simulators for the course.

FTC-Uljin

At Uljin Airport on South Korean's eastern coast, FTC-Uljin operates a pilot training course certified by Korea's Ministry of Land, Transport and Maritime Affairs. The airline pilot training program adheres to stringent global standards. FTC-Uljin operates seven brand new single engine aircraft with glass cockpits, as well as a multi-engine aircraft and two FTDs used for flight training.

International Programs

Korean Language Program 

The Korean Language Education Center (KLEC), established in July 2006, founded the Korean Language Program to meet the growing demand from foreign students for qualified, innovative, and progressive Korean language training. The program implements a proven program that has been nationally recognized as the most effective method of language acquisition to date. The curriculum is supported with supplemental materials such as exercise books.

Study abroad 

Korea Aerospace University provides study abroad programs for students to gain overseas experiences. The programs are NASA and Boeing Fieldtrip, Research Internship at University of Southern California (USC), Work & Travel Program at University of North Dakota (UND), visiting overseas firms by self-designed plan, and others.

Partner universities (by continent) 

 North America
Drexel University, U.S.
Eastern Kentucky University, U.S.
Embry-Riddle Aeronautical University, U.S. 
Florida Institute of Technology, U.S. 
Green Mountain College, U.S. 
Long Island University, U.S.
McGill University, Canada 
Marquette University, U.S. 
Michigan Technological University, U.S. 
Northrop-Rice Aeronautical University, U.S. 
Ohio State University, U.S. 
Ohio University, Avionics Engineering Center, U.S. 
Oregon State University, U.S. 
Rose-Hulman Institute of Technology, U.S. 
Saint Louis University Parks College, U.S. 
University of Arizona, U.S. 
University of Florida, U.S. 
University of Nebraska Kearney, U.S. 
University of North Dakota, U.S. 
University of Southern California, U.S.  
Virginia Polytechnic Institute and State University, U.S.
Asia
Fudan University, China 
Beijing University of Aeronautics & Astronautics, China 
Civil Aviation University of China, China 
Nanchang Institute of Aeronautical Technology, China 
Nanjing University of Aeronautics & Astronautics, China 
Qiqihar University, China 
Shanghai Jiao Tong University, China 
Shenyang Institute of Aeronautical Engineering, China 
Yanbian University of Science and Technology, China 
The Hong Kong Polytechnic University, Hong Kong 
India Hindustan University, India 
Vellore Institute of Technology, India 
Japan Chuo Gakuin University, Japan 
Japan Aviation Academy, Japan 
Kyoto University, Japan 
National Institute of Information and Communications Technology, Japan 
University of Malaya, Malaysia 
Ulaanbaatar College, Mongol 
Myanmar Aerospace Engineering University, Myanmar 
University of Computer Studies, Yangon 
Angeles University, Philippines
Bulacan State University, Philippines 
Saint Paul University, Philippines 
University of Cebu, Philippines 
University of Reginal Carmeli, Philippines 
University of Saint Tomas, Philippines 
University of Bangkok, Thailand
Tashkent State Technical University, Uzbekistan
Vietnam National University, Hanoi, Vietnam
Europe
Cranfield University, U.K
Imperial College of Science, Tech and Medicine, U.K 
University College London, U.K 
Brunel University, U.K 
Russia Academy of Civil Aviation, Russia 
Moscow State Aviation Institute, Russia 
University of Castilla-La Mancha, Spain 
International Space University, France 
Leiden University, Netherlands 
National Aviation University, Ukraine
Oceania
Central Queensland University, Australia
University of Sydney, Australia
Massey University, New Zealand

Notable alumni 

 Jongrok Yoon (윤종록): former vice minister of Ministry of Science, ICT and Future Planning
 Cheolsoo Bae (배철수): radio disc jockey and former vocalist and guitarist of a hard rock band, Song Gol Mae
 Youngkeun Chang (장영근): Professor, School of Aerospace and Mechanical Engineering, Korea Aerospace University
 Sooin Hong (홍수인): captain, Korean Air, the first woman captain of civil aircraft in Korea
 Chul Hwang(황철): head of flight operations, Korean Air
 Manhui Jang (장만희): vice president, Air Navigation Commission at ICAO
 Seokjin Kang (강석진): professor, United States Naval Academy
 Changyong Kim (김창용): vice president of Samsung Electronics at DMC
 Dongseong Kim](김동성): Associate Professor (full professor in the US), The University of Queensland, Australia
 Jungsik Kim (김정식): president, University-Industry Foundation at Soonchunhyang University
 Kyungjin Kim (김경진): president, EMC Korea
 Woojae Kim (김우재): president, World Federation of Overseas Korean Traders Associations
 Hwasuk Oh (오화석): professor, School of Aerospace and Mechanical Engineering, Korea Aerospace University
 Kwanghyun Seo (서광현): director, Korean Agency for Technology and Standards
 Jongwoon Shin (신종운): vice president, Hyundai-Kia Motor Group

References

External links 
 Korea Aerospace University (English)
 Korea Aerospace University (Korean)

Aerospace University
Private universities and colleges in South Korea
Aerospace
Goyang